I Can't Believe It's Teddybears STHLM is the second studio album by Teddybears STHLM. It was released in 1996 by MVG.

Track listing
All songs by Teddybears STHLM & lyrics by Patrik Arve, unless otherwise noted.
"Magic Finger" - 3:33
"Two Time Nation" - 3:33
"Fish Out of Water" - 2:57
"Irresistible Itch" - 2:38
"Kanzi" - 3:49
"Rude Criminal" - 2:46
"The Robots" - 3:02 (music & lyrics: Ralf Hütter, Florian Schneider & Karl Bartos)
"Jim" - 5:04
"Adapted" - 1:54
"Fellowship Blinkers" - 2:32
"Stumbles & Falls" - 4:06
"Me, Mum & Daddy" - 2:25
(untitled hidden track)
"Boris" - 3:44

Musicians
 Big Sweet Poppa Pat - vocals & human beatbox
 Jocko Apa - bass & vocals
 Klan Åhlund - guitar
 Erik Olsson - drums
 Christian Falcon Falk - drums
 Sleepy - scratches
 Per Lindvall - percussion

References
[ I Can't Believe It's Teddybears STHLM] at Allmusic

1996 albums
Teddybears (band) albums